The point of impact is the point to where a munition such as a bullet or artillery shell is delivered: see Ballistic impact.

Point of Impact may refer to:

Literature
 Point of Impact (Stephen Hunter novel), 1993
Point of Impact, a 2001 novel in the Tom Clancy's Net Force series written by Steve Perry
Point of Impact, a 1985 romance novel by Emma Darcy
Point of Impact (comics), a comic by Jay Faerber and Koray Kuranel

Entertainment
Point of Impact (film), a 1993 film starring Michael Paré and Barbara Carrera
Burnout 2: Point of Impact, a 2002-2003 video game in the Burnout series
"Point of Impact" (CSI: Miami), a 2009 episode of CSI: Miami